Flower Plower is the first studio album by the rock band Poster Children. Recorded in 1988–89, it was first released on vinyl by the Limited Potential label in 1989, and reissued on CD in 1991 by Frontier Records. Later the band acquired the rights to this album, and reissued it on their own label, 12 Inch Records, in 1999.

Track listing (original LP release)
 "Dangerous Life" – 2:06
 "Wanna" – 2:41
 "Byron's Song" – 3:53
 "Eye" – 2:55
 "Hollywood" – 1:40
 "Modern Art" – 2:34
 "Evidence" – 3:12
 "She Walks" – 3:33

CD re-issue bonus tracks

"10,000 Pieces" – 3:02
 "Question" – 3:16
 "Non-Reggae Song" – 1:49
 "Detective Tracy" – 3:29
 "Bump Bump" – 2:14
 "Jeremy Straight" – 2:20
 "Rain on Me" – 3:36

Personnel
Poster Children
Rick Valentin – vocals, guitar
Rose Marshack – bass, vocals
Brendan Gamble – drums (tracks 1–4)
Shannon Drew – drums (tracks 5–15)

Credits
Steve Albini – Engineer (tracks 1–4)
Iain Burgess – Engineer (tracks 5–15)

References

Poster Children albums
1991 albums
Frontier Records albums
Albums produced by Steve Albini